Arquimínio Rodrigues da Costa (8 July 1924 – 12 September 2016) was a Portuguese prelate of the Catholic Church. He was bishop of the Diocese of Macau from 1976 to 1988.

Life
Arquimínio Rodrigues da Costa, a native of São Mateus, Pico, Azores, entered the seminary of Macau in 1938 and was ordained a priest on 6 October 1949. In February 1955, he was appointed rector of this seminary.

On 20 January 1976, Pope Paul VI appointed him bishop of Macau. He was ordained bishop on 25 March 1976. On 6 October 1988, he resigned from this post. He received the Grand Cross of the Order of Merit of the Portuguese Republic in November 1988. After this, he worked in the Diocese while his health allowed him.

References

1924 births
2016 deaths
20th-century Roman Catholic bishops in Macau
Portuguese Roman Catholic bishops
People from Pico Island